Dean F. Jenkins (born November 21, 1959 in Billerica, Massachusetts) is an American former ice hockey player who played in five games during the 1983–84 season for the Los Angeles Kings in the National Hockey League (NHL). The rest of his career, which lasted from 1981 to 1985, was spent in the American Hockey League.

Career statistics

Regular season and playoffs

External links
 

1959 births
Living people
American men's ice hockey right wingers
Hershey Bears players
Ice hockey players from Massachusetts
Los Angeles Kings players
New Haven Nighthawks players
People from Billerica, Massachusetts
Sportspeople from Middlesex County, Massachusetts
Undrafted National Hockey League players
UMass Lowell River Hawks men's ice hockey players